John Kaney (December 5, 1869 in Sandusky, Wisconsin – December 20, 1935) was a member of the Wisconsin State Assembly. He graduated from high school in Sextonville, Wisconsin before graduating from what was then the Wisconsin State College of Milwaukee and the Marquette University Law School.

Career
Kaney was elected to the Assembly in 1918. Previously, he was City Attorney of Milwaukee, Wisconsin from 1906 to 1910 and a Milwaukee alderman from 1912 to 1916. He was a Republican.

References

People from Sauk County, Wisconsin
People from Richland County, Wisconsin
Politicians from Milwaukee
Republican Party members of the Wisconsin State Assembly
Wisconsin city council members
Wisconsin lawyers
University of Wisconsin–Milwaukee alumni
Marquette University Law School alumni
1869 births
1935 deaths